Søffren Degen   (October 12, 1816 – July 7, 1885) was a Danish classical guitarist and composer.

See also
List of Danish composers

References
This article was initially translated from the Danish Wikipedia.

Danish classical guitarists
Male composers
1816 births
1885 deaths
19th-century Danish composers
19th-century male musicians
19th-century guitarists